Rosenort Airport  is located adjacent to Rosenort, Manitoba, Canada.

References

Registered aerodromes in Manitoba